This is a list of ARIA club chart number-one hits from 2006, which is collected from Australian Recording Industry Association (ARIA) from weekly DJ reports.

Chart

Number-one artists

See also
ARIA Charts
List of number-one singles of 2006 (Australia)
List of number-one albums of 2006 (Australia)
2006 in music

References

2006 Club
Australia Club Chart
2006 in Australian music